Mount Cameroon Football Club is a Cameroonian football club based in Buéa. The club was founded in 1997 by Hon. Calvin Foinding. They have competed for more than 12 years in the Cameroon Première Division (Elite One). Their home stadium is the 3,200 seat Molyko Omnisport Stadium but Mount Cameroon FC also plays its home matches on its own academy "Stade d'Honneur" field.

Mount Cameroon FC took football in the region to the pinnacle in 2002 when they became the first club in the region and second West of the Mungo to lift the Cup of Cameroon.

Notable players
Mount Cameroon FC have served as a springboard for several youth players who have gone on to have successful professional careers. Notable players who started their careers at MCFC include Eyong Enoh, Charley Roussel Fomen, Valentine Atem, Donald Djousse and Elvis Mokake.

Management and coaching

Club officials 

 President: Hon. Calvin Foinding
 Vice-President: Chrysanthus Kongnso
 Secretary General: Cedric Foinding

Coaching 

 Head Coach: Ache Ebenezer Edong
 Assistant Coach: Pascal Moumi
 Assistant Coach: Mutia Jonathan Batambuh

Honours
 Cameroon Première Division: 
Cameroon Cup: 1
Winners
 2002.
 Super Coupe Roger Milla: 1
Winners
 2002.

Performance in CAF competitions
CAF Confederation Cup: 1 appearance 2008 - Second Round of 16
CAF Cup Winners' Cup: 1 appearance 2003 - Second Round

References

Football clubs in Cameroon
Association football clubs established in 1997
1997 establishments in Cameroon
Sports clubs in Cameroon